Webster Limited is an Australian business founded in 1831 by Alexander Webster, just 28 years after the settlement of Van Diemen's Land. Founded as a traditional pastoral house, Webster Limited is now a diversified food and agribusiness. Webster Limited acquired the Riverina walnut assets from Gunns Limited in 2010 and is now Australia and the southern hemisphere's largest walnut grower through its ownership and/or management of more than 2,200ha of orchards in Tasmania and the Riverina.
Webster has since diversified into cotton and livestock following their  116 million purchase of the 40,000-hectare prime Riverina cropping aggregation, "Kooba", in 2010.

Acquisition and de-listing from ASX 
All capital in Webster has been acquired by the Canadian Public Sector Pension Investment Board (PSP Investments). PSP Investments have added the assets of Webster Limited to their stable of Australian agricultural investments including investments in the major Queensland based nut producer Stahmann Farms Enterprises (SFE).

On 21 February 2020 PSP delisted Webster from the Australian Securities Exchange.

References

External links
 Webster Limited homepage

Companies formerly listed on the Australian Securities Exchange
Agriculture companies of Australia
Companies established in 1831
Companies based in Tasmania
Australian companies established in 1831